Tuzemák, formerly called Tuzemský rum, is a traditional Czech distilled beverage. It is a substitute good (ersatz) for true rum which is produced from sugarcane mainly in the Caribbean and Latin America. Since the 19th century, Tuzemák became one of the most popular spirits in the Czech lands.

Tuzemský is produced from potatoes or sugar beets, diluted and flavoured by various rum essences. In the 19th century similar substitutes were produced throughout the crown lands of the Austro-Hungarian monarchy, which had no access to tropical colonies; they were named Inländer-Rum (like Stroh in Austria, today produced from sugarcane molasses and therefore a genuine spiced rum), Domači or Čajni (Croatia) etc.

EU regulations allow the name "rum" to be applied only to products made from sugarcane. As a result, from 1 January 2003, this product is sold under other names like "Tuzemák" or "Tuzemský".

See also
 Jägertee
 Stroh

External links
Tuzemský rum and the EU - 
Czech tuzemák rum goes on sale in Canada

References

 
Czech distilled drinks